Jaakko Tommi Kristian Evilä (born 6 April 1980 in Tampere) is a Finnish former long jumper. He gained fame following his surprise bronze in the 2005 Helsinki World Championships, which was Finland's only medal in the championships.

He won the bronze medal in a wind-aided 8.25 metre jump. Before the 2005 World Championships he had finished tenth at the 1998 World Junior Championships and fourth at the 2005 European Indoor Championships. He then improved his personal best jump to 8.19 metres in August, and finished sixth at the 2005 World Athletics Final.

Years troubled by injuries then followed. He did achieve a wind-aided result of 8.41 metres at the 2007 Finland-Sweden international. In June 2008 he set a Finnish national record of 8.22 metres in Gothenburg. He competed at the 2008 Olympic Games, but did not reach the final round.  In 2009, Evila rediscovered some of his best form.

He competed in the 2010 Finnish Elite Games and came close to winning the jackpot, having won the long jump at four out of five meetings. It was not to be, however, as he finished third in the final competition. This dropped him into fourth place overall and Levern Spencer of St. Lucia topped the rankings to win the prize.

Competition record

References

 

1980 births
Living people
Sportspeople from Tampere
Finnish male long jumpers
Athletes (track and field) at the 2008 Summer Olympics
Olympic athletes of Finland
World Athletics Championships medalists
20th-century Finnish people
21st-century Finnish people